Thomas Brown may refer to:

Arts and literature
Thomas Brown (satirist) (1662–1704), English satirist
Thomas Brown (philosopher) (1778–1820), Scottish poet and philosopher
Thomas Brown, pen name of Thomas Moore (1779–1852)
Thomas Brown (architect) (1781–1850), Scottish architect
Thomas Brown (prison architect) (1806–1872), Scottish architect
Thomas Edward Brown (1830–1897), Manx poet, scholar, and divine
T. Allston Brown (Thomas Allston Brown, 1836–1918), American theater critic and historian
Thomas Wilson Brown (born 1972), American actor

Business and industry
Thomas Brown (businessman) (1738–1797), American husbandman, businessman, and land speculator
Thomas Brown (engineer) (1772–1850), English surveyor, engineer, businessman, and landowner
Thomas Forster Brown (1835–1907), English civil and mining engineer

Politics and law

Australia
Thomas Brown (settler) (1803–1863), Australian pastoralist and politician
Thomas Brown (New South Wales colonial politician) (1811–1889), New South Wales politician
Thomas Brown (New South Wales politician) (1861–1934), Australian farmer and politician
Thomas Leishman Brown (1862–1946), Australian politician and trade unionist

United States
Thomas Brown (Florida politician) (1785–1867), American politician, second Governor of Florida
Thomas J. Brown (judge) (1836–1915), Chief Justice of the Supreme Court of Texas
Thomas H. Brown (mayor) (1839–1908), American politician, mayor of Milwaukee, Wisconsin
Thomas C. Brown (1870–1952), New York state senator
Thomas H. Brown (Michigan politician) (1917–2002), American politician

Other countries
Thomas Watters Brown (1879–1944), Northern Irish politician
Thomas James Brown (1886–1970), British coal miner and Labour Party politician

Religion
Thomas Brunce (a.k.a. "Thomas Brown", c. 1388–1445) English Bishop of Rochester & of Norwich
Thomas Brown (martyr) (1530–1556), English protestant martyred during the Marian persecutions
Thomas Brown (minister of St John's, Glasgow) (1776–1847), Moderator of the General Assembly of the Free Church of Scotland 
Joseph Brown (bishop) (Thomas Joseph Brown, 1796–1880), English bishop of the Roman Catholic Church
Thomas Brown (minister and natural historian) (1811–1893), Moderator of the General Assembly of the Free Church of Scotland, author of Annals
Tom Brown (bishop of Wellington) (born 1943), Anglican bishop in New Zealand
Thomas J. Brown (bishop of Maine) (born 1970), American bishop of the Episcopal Diocese of Maine

Science and medicine
Thomas Brown of Lanfine and Waterhaughs (1774–1853), Scottish surgeon, botanist, and mineralogist
Thomas Brown (naturalist) (1785–1862), English naturalist
Thomas Graham Brown (1882–1965), Scottish physiologist and mountaineer
Thomas Townsend Brown (1905–1985), American scientific researcher and inventor
Thomas McPherson Brown (1906–1989), American rheumatologist

Sports

Cricket
Thomas Brown (cricketer, born 1845) (1845–?), English cricketer
Thomas Brown (cricketer, born 1848) (1848–1919), English cricketer
Thomas Brown (cricketer, born 1854) (1854–1936), English cricketer
Thomas Brown (cricketer, born 1863) (1863–1930), English cricketer

Other sports
Thomas Brown (sport shooter) (1885–1950), American Olympic sport shooter
Thomas Brown (footballer) (fl. 1907–1910), English footballer
T. J. Brown (baseball) (Thomas Julius Brown, 1915–1973), American Negro league baseball player
Thomas P. Brown, Jr. (1921–2011), American tennis player
Thomas Brown (defensive end) (born 1957), American football defensive end 
Thomas Brown (rugby) (born 1983), Welsh rugby union and rugby league player, not to be confused with Tom Brown, born 1990
Thomas Brown (American football coach) (born 1986), American football running back

Others
Thomas Brown (loyalist) (1750–1825), American Revolution commander of King's Rangers in Georgia
Thomas Storrow Brown (1803–1888), Canadian journalist, orator, and revolutionary
Thomas L. Brown II (born 1960), United States Navy officer

See also
Tom Brown (disambiguation)
Tommy Brown (disambiguation)
Thomas Browne (disambiguation)